C'est la vie is a 2012 studio album by Algerian singer Khaled and a follow-up to his career. It marks his first major collaboration with producer RedOne. It was released on AZ record label and peaked at number 5 on SNEP, the official French Albums Chart. The Album sold over 4 million copies worldwide.

The songs utilize mainly Arabic, but there are also some French and English languages used. The title track "C'est la vie" was a successful single on the French Singles Chart reaching number 4 in French Singles Chart. There are collaborations on the album by Pitbull, Mazagan and Marwan.

Track listing

References

2012 albums
Khaled (musician) albums